Francis Shepherd may refer to:
 Francis Shepherd (diplomat), British diplomat
 Francis Henry Shepherd, English-born civil engineer and political figure in British Columbia, Canada

See also
 Frances Alice Shepherd, Canadian oncologist
 Francis Parker Shepard, American sedimentologist